Couratari is a genus of trees in the family Lecythidaceae, first described as a genus in 1775. They are native to tropical South America and Central America.

They are large trees, often rising above the rainforest canopy. The leaves are evergreen, alternate, simple, elliptical, up to 15 cm long, with a serrate to serrulate margin. Vernation lines parallel to the midvein are often visible  - a very unusual characteristic. The fruit is 6–15 cm long, and roughly conical. A central plug drops out at maturity, releasing the winged seeds to be dispersed by wind. The fruit of Cariniana may be distinguished from those of Couratari, as the former have longitudinal ridges, whereas the latter bears a single calyx-derived ring near the fruit apex.

Species

References

External links
Field Museum: Couratari photos
Field Museum Herbarium: Couratari photos

 
Ericales genera